Wang Qiang was the defending champion, but chose not to participate.
Zheng Saisai won the title, defeating Liu Fangzhou 6–2, 6–3 in the final.

Seeds

Draw

Finals

Top half

Bottom half

References
Main Draw

Blossom Cup - Singles
Industrial Bank Cup